The Fateh Oil Field, also called the Fath Oil Field, is an area of offshore oil production approximately  from Dubai and within that emirate's territory in the Persian Gulf. It was discovered in 1966, and was named Fateh (meaning "Conqueror") by Dubai monarch Rashid bin Saeed Al Maktoum. In 1968, Continental Oil Company announced plans to construct a  underwater oil storage facility to hold petroleum extracted from the field. The underwater storage was a world first, as before that time, offshore oil production had been channeled to onshore storage and tanker loading facilities. The first of these underwater holding tanks, called "Khazzan", was completed in 1969, the date the first barrel of oil was shipped from the field to world markets on September 22, 1969.

References

Oil fields of the United Arab Emirates
1969 establishments in the Trucial States